Harrison Smith (born 1989) is an American football player.

Harrison Smith may also refer to:

 Harrison Smith (runner) (1876–1947), American track and field athlete
 Harrison Smith, founder of publishers Smith and Haas, bought by Random House in 1936

See also
Harry Smith (disambiguation)